Verkhnyaya Serebryanka is a rural locality (a selo) and the administrative center of Verkhneserebryanskoye Rural Settlement, Rovensky District, Belgorod Oblast, Russia. The population was 844 as of 2010. There are 4 streets.

Geography 
Verkhnyaya Serebryanka is located 19 km southeast of Rovenki (the district's administrative centre) by road. Nizhnyaya Serebryanka is the nearest rural locality.

References 

Rural localities in Rovensky District, Belgorod Oblast